Pella is a genus of rove beetles.

Species
 Pella angustula (Casey, 1893)
 Pella caliginosa (Casey, 1893)
 Pella carolina (Casey, 1911)
 Pella criddlei (Casey, 1911)
 Pella fauveli (Sharp, 1883)
 Pella gesneri Klimaszewski in Klimaszewski, Sweeney, Price & Pelletier, 2005
 Pella loricata (Casey, 1893)
 Pella maoershanensis Song & Li, 2013 
 Pella recisa (Casey, 1911)
 Pella schmitti (Hamilton, 1895)

References

Aleocharinae genera
Beetles described in 1835